Savaleyevo (Häwäläy) is a rural locality (a village) and the administrative centre of Savaleyevsky Selsoviet, Karmaskalinsky District, Bashkortostan, Russia. The population was 1,013 as of 2010. There are 22 streets.

Geography 
Savaleyevo is located 21 km northeast of Karmaskaly (the district's administrative centre) by road. Bishaul-Ungarovo is the nearest rural locality.

References 

Rural localities in Karmaskalinsky District